Zub is a 1986 computer game.

Zub or ZUB may also refer to:
Zub (surname)
ZUB 1xx, a family of train protection systems produced by Siemens
Zub Lake, Queen Maud Land, Antarctica